1145 Aluminium alloy is a nearly pure aluminium alloy with minor impurities like copper, manganese, magnesium, zinc, titanium, silicon and iron.

Chemical composition

Physical properties

References

Aluminium alloy table 

Aluminium alloys